Since We've Become Translucent is the sixth studio album by the grunge band Mudhoney, released in 2002. The album was the first to be recorded after the departure of their original bassist, Matt Lukin, three years earlier. It was also the first to be released through Sub Pop after the band returned to the label.

Since We've Become Translucent marked a prominent change in the band's sound. The album was a departure from their typical garage-oriented sound and features a relatively accessible rock sound. However, on tracks such as "Baby, Can You Dig the Light?", psychedelica, synthpop, and jazz are explored.

Track listing
"Baby, Can You Dig the Light?" - 8:26
"The Straight Life" - 3:33
"Where the Flavor Is" - 3:34
"In the Winner's Circle" - 4:27
"Our Time Is Now" - 3:39
"Dyin' for It" - 4:54
"Inside Job" - 2:52
"Take It Like a Man" - 2:35
"Crooked and Wide" - 4:54
"Sonic Infusion" - 7:40

Personnel

Band
 Mark Arm - vocals, guitar, organ, piano
 Steve Turner - electric guitar, backing vocals
 Guy Maddison - bass guitar
 Dan Peters - drums

Additional musicians
 Jo Claxton - violin.
 Martin Feveyear - backing vocals
 Craig Flory - horn arrangements, sax (baritone, tenor)
 Jeff McGrath - trumpet
 Greg Powers - trombone
 Wayne Kramer - bass guitar on "Inside Job"

References

Mudhoney albums
2002 albums
Sub Pop albums